The Desert Song is a 1943 American musical film. It was directed by Robert Florey and starred Dennis Morgan, Irene Manning and Bruce Cabot. It is based on the 1926 operetta with music by Sigmund Romberg. It was nominated for an Academy Award for Best Art Direction (Charles Novi, Jack McConaghy).

This film version of the operetta was, like the 1929 film version, almost never seen after its original release due to content and copyright issues, which made the film hard to find or view. In 2014, it was remastered, restored and released on DVD by Warner Brothers.

The film is more sophisticated technically than the earlier film due to its large budget and advances in both sound and color. This is the first film version to be made in full three-strip Technicolor. It tries to make the operetta topical in terms of World War II, by having the outlaw hero with a dual identity fight the Nazis as well as the Riffs. As in the 1953 film, the hero's name is changed to El Khobar, rather than the Red Shadow.

The 1943 Desert Song is perhaps the only instance in which a stage operetta of the 1920s has been updated to reflect topical concerns of the 1940s. In fact, the  United States Office of War Information held up release of the film for a year because of the shifting political positions of Vichy France. It did well at the box office nonetheless, and was Warner Brothers' highest grossing film of the year.

Cast
 Dennis Morgan as Paul Hudson/El Khobar
 Irene Manning as Margot
 Bruce Cabot as Col. Fontaine
 Lynne Overman as Johnny Walsh
 Gene Lockhart as Pere FanFan
 Faye Emerson as Hajy
 Victor Francen as Caid Yousseff
 Curt Bois as François
 Jack La Rue as Lt. Bertin
 Marcel Dalio as Tarbouch
 Cee Pee Johnson as Drummer in Moroccan cafe sequence (uncredited)

Box office
The film was Warner Bros.' most popular of the year, earning $2,561,000 domestically and $2,034,000 foreign.

References

External links
 
 
 
 

1943 films
1943 musical films
1943 adventure films
American musical films
American adventure films
American black-and-white films
1940s English-language films
Films directed by Robert Florey
Films set in deserts
Films set in Morocco
Films based on operettas
Musical film remakes
Operetta films
Warner Bros. films
World War II films made in wartime